The year 2007 in Australian television was the 52nd year of continuous operation.

Events 

 15 January – Channel Nine, NBN Television & WIN Television relaunch their on-air presentation.
 22 January – Monique Wright was then crowned Sunrise's new weather presenter. A year later Monique Wright left Sunrise and the prize went to Fifi Box. On that day, SBS's World News is revamped with a 1-hour format.
 29 January – Former Who Wants to Be a Millionaire? host and CEO of the Nine Network, Eddie McGuire, returns to screens as the host of Nine's new game show 1 vs. 100. Also debuting on the same night, but at a different time, is the Seven Network's big money game show The Rich List hosted by Andrew O'Keefe. National Nine News nearly relaunch their news graphics, but on that day, this never happened.
 9 February – The Australian Football League signs a five-year broadcasting contract with the Seven Network, Network Ten and pay TV provider Foxtel, in a controversial deal that will see half of the AFL matches played each week broadcast on Foxtel instead of free-to-air television.
 12 February – Jodi Power, a family friend of convicted drug smuggler Schapelle Corby, made allegations in a paid interview on Channel Seven's Today Tonight that Corby's sister Mercedes had previously asked Power to transport drugs to Bali and that Mercedes had confessed to smuggling compressed cannabis concealed inside her body into Indonesia. Mercedes is interviewed by Tracy Grimshaw on Channel Nine's major rival program A Current Affair on 14 February.
 30 March – The Seven Network broadcasts its first AFL premiership match since the 2001 AFL Grand Final, for another long-indefinite run.
 1 April – The Seven Network signs a $3 million a year for the broadcast rights to the fourth series of Kath & Kim, a popular sitcom which had previously aired until their final appearance on the ABC in 2005 as Da Kath & Kim Code.
 7 April – Australian music program Rage celebrates 20 years on air is over 4 weeks in 20 Years Of Rage.
 9–13 April – The fourth season of The Mole is replayed during the afternoon period, during the NSW school holidays.
 16 April – Australia's Leader of the Opposition Kevin Rudd and Federal Minister for Employment and Workplace Relations Joe Hockey discontinue their weekly appearances on Seven's breakfast news program Sunrise after four years. The decision follows possibly politically damaging accusations that Sunrise had requested that Rudd appear at a dawn service for ANZAC Day in Long Tan, Vietnam, with the service held an hour early to accommodate the time difference for live television.
 28 April – 12-year-old singer Bonnie Anderson s the first season of Australia's Got Talent
 1 May – Singer Kate Ceberano and her partner John-Paul Collins  the sixth season of Dancing with the Stars.
 18 May – After a tumultuous 15-month reign, the CEO of the Nine Network, Eddie McGuire, resigns.
 18 June – Seven Network's The Morning Show is introduced, marking a new millennium in daytime television.
 2 July – National Nine News nearly tipped to relaunch their news graphics, this also never happened as it lost it to Seven News.
 23 July – Long running soap opera Neighbours has a major cast revamp to try to improve its struggling ratings, and continue its long-run on the Network Ten.
 29 July – Seven Network claims 20th record-breaking ratings win of the year to secure ratings year.
 19 August – Fourth series premiere of Kath & Kim at 7 – 30pm, now on the Seven Network, attracts an audience of 2.521 million nationally, making it the most watched television programme so far in 2007 and the highest rating ever for a first episode in the history of Australian television.
 26 August – Veteran journalist, TV legend and former A Current Affair host Ray Martin announces he is leaving the Nine Network after thirty years, citing disillusionment with the network's management.
 6 September – Julian Morrow and Chas Licciardello from The Chaser's War on Everything along with nine other production crew members are arrested in Sydney during the APEC summit for entering a restricted area. Those arrested were travelling in a fake Canadian motorcade and Licciardello was dressed up as Osama bin Laden.
 9 September – Seven Network journalist Ben Davis is attacked outside Melbourne's Olympic Park Stadium by a gang of drunken Brisbane Broncos supporters during a live cross to Seven's Brisbane bulletin.
 1 October – Seven News Perth journalist Chris Mainwaring dies from a drug overdose. Just the day before, Mainwaring was preparing for a boxing duel with cricketer Justin Langer, parts of which appear on the Seven News bulletin on the day of his death.
 15 October – Seven HD launches.
 21 October – The Nine Network includes the "worm" audience reaction graph in their broadcast of the election debate between John Howard and Kevin Rudd, despite agreements to the contrary. The National Press Club cut Nine's transmission feed, and the ABC cut their backup feed. Nine continued to transmit by adding the worm to the Sky News broadcast.
 22 October – After 18 months off the air, Who Wants to Be a Millionaire? makes a brief return to Australian television; lasting just five weeks of more poor ratings.
 29 October – Seven HD and Prime Television service a new regional multi-channel, Prime HD.
 2 November – Perth-based Network Ten's news anchorperson Charmaine Dragun is found dead near Sydney, apparently due to a suicide.
 25 November – Natalie Gauci becomes the last woman to win the fifth series of Australian Idol, then months later her singing career tanked.
 27 November – McLeod's Daughters actress Bridie Carter and her partner Craig Monley win the seventh season of Dancing with the Stars.
 30 November – Daryl Somers announces he is quitting the hosting job of the Seven Network's high-rating reality show Dancing with the Stars.
 3 December –
 Seven's Melbourne news bulletin defeats its Nine and Ten counterparts in the ratings for the first time in nearly 30 years. Seven won 20 weeks, Nine won 19 and the other week was tied.
 American science fiction sitcom The Big Bang Theory created by Chuck Lorre, the creator of Two and a Half Men premieres on the Nine Network at 7:30 pm.
 16 December – Ten HD launches.
 December – The Seven Network wins the ratings year for the first time since 1978 (excluding 2000, the year of the Sydney Olympics), thanks to their "Seven in '07" campaign which aired at the start of the year.
 December – Network Ten broadcasts Sony Pictures movies for the final-ever time, before handing the television rights to the Nine Network. Ten later revived the Sony Pictures output deal 6 years later.
 The 2004 romance film The Notebook starring Ryan Gosling and Rachel McAdams premieres on the Nine Network.

Ratings – network shares

New channels 
 13 July – National Indigenous Television
 15 October – Seven HD
 29 October – Prime HD (serviced by Seven HD)
 1 December – Showcase
 16 December – Ten HD

Debuts

Subscription television

New international programming

Subscription television

Specials

Other debuts

Documentaries

International

Programming changes 

Below is a list programs which made their premiere on free-to-air television that had previously premiered on Australian Pay TV; a program may still air on the original network.

Subscription premieres 
This is a list of programs which made their premiere on Australian subscription television that had previously premiered on Australian free-to-air television. Programs may still air on the original free-to-air television network.

Domestic

International

Ending this year

Sporting rights

See also 
 2007 in Australia
 List of Australian films of 2007

Notes 
  Tsunami – The Aftermath was edited from a 2-part miniseries, into a single, 2½ hour telemovie
  Superstorm was edited from a 3-part miniseries, into a single, 2½ hour telemovie

References